Heavy weapon or Heavy Weapon may refer to:
 A weapon system that is too big and heavy for infantry to carry and thus rely on mounting platforms (vehicles, aircraft, watercraft or fortifications) to operate
 Crew-served weapon, a weapon that requires more than one person to transport or operate
 Heavy weapons platoon, an infantry platoon equipped with such weapons
 Heavy Weapon, a 2005 shoot-'em-up video game
 Heavy Weapons Guy, a Team Fortress 2 character